The Millionaire is an American anthology series that aired on CBS from 1955 to 1960. It was originally sponsored by Colgate-Palmolive. The series, produced by Don Fedderson and Fred Henry, explored the ways that sudden and unexpected wealth changed life, for better or for worse. It told the stories of people who were given one million dollars ($ in  dollars) from a benefactor who insisted they must never know his identity, with one exception.

The series became a five-season hit during the Golden Age of Television, finishing in the Nielsen ratings at #9 for the 1955–1956 season, #13 in 1956–1957, #17 in 1957–1958 and #30 in 1958–1959. In syndication, it was known by two titles: The Millionaire and If You Had a Million.

The Benefactor
The benefactor was named John Beresford Tipton. Viewers heard his voice, making observations and giving instructions; they generally saw only his arm as he reached for a cashier's check for one million dollars each week and handed it to Michael Anthony, his executive secretary. It was Anthony's job to deliver that check to its intended recipient.  The voice of the unseen John Beresford Tipton was played—uncredited—by veteran character actor and voice artist Paul Frees.  (Frees was seen on camera playing other roles in two episodes.)  In the closing credits of each episode, the actors and the roles they played would be listed, invariably ending with "and John Beresford Tipton", implying that he was a real person playing himself. The character's name was actually derived from the birthplaces of Millionaire producer Don Fedderson and his wife Tido: they were born in Beresford, South Dakota and Tipton, Missouri, respectively.

The Executive Secretary
Invariably, The Millionaire began with a very brief opening theme fanfare behind the ascending title frame, followed by the camera's training directly upon Michael Anthony, played by veteran character actor and radio and television announcer Marvin Miller.

The Millionaire told the stories of Tipton's beneficiaries in flashback, as if from Anthony's case files. Each episode began with Anthony, behind his desk and looking directly into the camera, speaking one or another variation on this theme:

From there, the camera faded to a brief tour of the grounds on which Tipton's home stood, as Anthony continued speaking:

The camera then showed Anthony entering Tipton's presence, with Tipton frequently engaged in another one of his many wide-ranging hobbies.  Anthony invariably greeted him with, "You sent for me, sir?" Tipton spoke for a moment to Anthony (always referring to him as "Mike"), chatting about his doings and explaining what prompted him to choose "our next millionaire", before he actually handed Anthony the envelope containing the check, sometimes adding, "I'll want a full report."

Though "Tipton" was heard in every episode, Miller was the only cast member who was seen in every episode.  He was usually only seen in the first few minutes of any given story, returning very briefly to directly address viewers at the episode's end (often promoting the story in next week's episode).  These closings are often cut in syndicated airings.

Others
The only other recurring supporting actor was Roy Gordon as banker Andrew V. McMahon, on whose Gotham Trust Bank the anonymous Tipton's cashier's checks were drawn. In a few of the very earliest episodes, recipients had to pick up their check at the bank and it was McMahon (not Michael Anthony) who interacted with the recipients of Tipton's money and outlined the conditions of acceptance.  Fairly quickly, this was altered to having Anthony personally deliver the check (and outline the conditions of acceptance), rendering the McMahon character superfluous. Accordingly, McMahon was seen in about half the episodes from the first season, and in the first two episodes of the second season—then was dropped.  Later episodes showed a close up of a cashier's check drawn from the "First Molkefstorming Bank".

Ed Herlihy was the announcer for The Millionaire throughout the run.  Not a cast member—but seen in a cameo appearance in virtually every episode as a prominently featured extra—was Tido Fedderson.

The beneficiaries

Following the commercial break, Anthony, back in the present and behind his desk, would introduce the week's millionaire.

Exactly how Tipton chose whom to make an instant millionaire was never necessarily disclosed, although Tipton made it plain in the show's first episode exactly what his intentions were. Saying that he wanted to set up a new kind of chess game, "with human beings," Tipton told Anthony:

After showing the beneficiary in a typical situation for a few minutes at the beginning of the episode, Anthony would arrive, deliver the check, and have the beneficiary sign a legal statement binding him or her never to reveal the source of this million-dollar gift except to a spouse (if the recipient was single, Anthony would add, "... should you marry"), under penalty of forfeit. Once the document was signed and the thanks were given, Anthony disappeared from the beneficiary's life,  never to return. The remainder of the episode showed how the gift affected the beneficiary.

The beneficiaries were not always poor but could be from any social class or occupation, from secretaries, salespeople, and construction workers to professionals like doctors, lawyers, even writers. Nor were they always likely to find their lives changed for the better because of their sudden wealth. In one episode, "The Jerry Bell Story", Charles Bronson played a once-lonely writer who first invests some of his unexpected fortune in the surgery to restore his blind fiancée's (Georgeann Johnson) eyesight, only to disappear at the moment her bandages were removed, fearful she would reject him because of his plain looks.

The series ran for 207 episodes, and Tipton made 206 millionaires. (One recipient returned the money.)  However, the amount Tipton invested in his hobby was much more than $206 million, since, as Anthony told the recipient each week, "The taxes have already been paid."

The exceptions
Tipton did meet one beneficiary, a man condemned to be executed for a crime he never committed. He used a portion of his million-dollar gift to prove his innocence, with direct help from Michael Anthony, the only time Anthony stayed in even the periphery of a beneficiary's life.

Tipton visited the man as he was about to leave prison, though he was shown in his customary position: from behind, only his hand or arm and a brief glimpse of the top of his head in view. The only other time Tipton was seen in any episode, beyond his presentation of Anthony with the next check to deliver, was one in which Anthony was arrested and needed Tipton to bail him out so that he could finish the mission.

In another episode, Anthony said that the beneficiary "got the money, all right ... but not from me." Anthony was on his way to deliver the check when he was run down in a street accident, and the check was jarred loose from his possession. It made its way around a few stunned townspeople before it finally reached its rightful owner, offering a short study of those people's reactions to instant wealth as well as the intended recipient's.

In the first episode, during which Tipton explained to Anthony his human chess match, the recipient—a young woman who worked as a sales clerk—actually returned the bulk of her unexpected fortune, saying it wasn't worth allowing her husband-to-be to feel like a "kept man."

End of production
The Millionaire ceased regular series production in 1960, its final regular episode, "The Patricia Collins Story", airing June 7, 1960, and its final summer reruns in its regular production time slot appearing that September. The show became a familiar presence in syndicated reruns from the 1960s through the 1980s, both on its original network, CBS, and on numerous regional independent stations. In 1999, the TV Land cable channel aired a few selected episodes. The show was never officially released on home video. CBS also aired daytime reruns in the early 1960s, with Bern Bennett being the live announcer for these. The Millionaire also aired on ABC in Australia on January 2, 1959.

In 2015, the series began to air on CBS's digital subchannel network Decades, and indeed, it unofficially launched the network on January 16, 2015, as part of the network's "countdown" to its Memorial Day launch, where 186 out of the 207 episodes of the series (along with others on the Decades schedule) were screened back-to-back consecutively. Nineteen episodes were excluded from airing, and according to CBS Television Distribution, these episodes were also removed from syndication. But CBS Television Distribution did not disclose the reasons for these episodes being removed from syndication. The show had formerly aired on Weigel Broadcasting's Heroes & Icons weekdays from 5:00am to 6:00am EST, but was later removed in the first quarter of 2015.

Up until 2019, the show was not transmitted regularly on any television network. It is now playing on Decades every weekday from 6am to 7am.

Creator and producer Don Fedderson later produced a TV movie version of The Millionaire with Martin Balsam as Arthur Haines and Robert Quarry as Michael Anthony. The movie was intended as a backdoor pilot for a revival series, which never occurred.

Guest stars
Since each episode featured a different beneficiary, numerous guest stars appeared during The Millionaire's production, including Richard Anderson, Joanna Barnes, Patricia Barry, Orson Bean, Charles Bronson, Edgar Buchanan, Carleton Carpenter, John Carradine, Marguerite Chapman, Chuck Connors, Mike Connors, Royal Dano, Angie Dickinson, Mason Alan Dinehart, Barbara Eden, Yvonne Lime Fedderson, Virginia Field, Dick Foran, Beverly Garland, Lisa Gaye, James Gleason, Don Gordon, Frank Gorshin, Peter Graves, George Grizzard, Harry Guardino, Barbara Hale, Murray Hamilton, Dennis Hopper, William Hopper, Frieda Inescort, David Janssen, Jack Kelly, Robert Knapp, Nan Leslie, Margaret Lindsay, Jack Lord, Celia Lovsky, Nora Marlowe, Frank McHugh, Joyce Meadows, Lee Meriwether, Martin Milner, Mary Tyler Moore, Joanna Moore, Agnes Moorehead, Rita Moreno, Lori Nelson, Susan Oliver, Larry Pennell, Paul Picerni, Denver Pyle, John Smith, Kent Smith, Aaron Spelling, Olive Sturgess, Marshall Thompson, Regis Toomey, Ernest Truex, Robert Vaughn, Betty White, Grant Williams, DeForest Kelley, and Dick York.

At least two professional athletes appeared on the show: basketball and baseball player Chuck Connors (who also had a career as an actor) and Hall of Fame baseball pitcher Don Drysdale.

Episodes

Season 1 (1955)

Season 2 (1955–56)

Season 3 (1956–57)

Season 4 (1957–58)

Season 5 (1958–59)

Season 6 (1959–60)

Parodies
The Millionaire was parodied in a 1958 episode of The Jack Benny Program, in which Dennis Day became a Tipton beneficiary, with Marvin Miller as Michael Anthony delivering the unexpected gift.

During its fourth season, The Twilight Zone was expanded to an hour. Rod Serling, upset at this change, wrote an episode that season called "The Bard" about a hack television writer who was unable to come up with anything good until he inadvertently summoned the ghost of William Shakespeare. One of his bad ideas was an in-joke ... "We take The Millionaire, expand it to an hour, and call it The Multimillionaire!"

In 1978, the Canadian sketch comedy program SCTV produced a parody of the show called The $Millionaire. In it, Tipton (played by Joe Flaherty) has given away so much money over the years that he is practically broke. He now can only afford to give away $50 at a time, much to the embarrassment of Anthony (played by John Candy).

Mad Magazine included The Millionaire in a parody article during the run of the show. Miller's character approaches a subject and says, "My name is Michael Anthony, and I have been authorized to give you one million dollars!" The man tears up the check, saying, "My name is Mike Todd, and I don't need it!"

In the sitcom Cheers, the episode "How to Marry a Mailman" opens with Norm Peterson and Cliff Clavin explaining The Millionaire and its premise to multi-millionaire Robin Colcord in an effort to get Colcord to give them a million dollars.

Similar productions
The 1932 film If I Had a Million involves a dying businessman who leaves his money to eight strangers.  The movie had seven directors and multiple screenwriters.

The 1983–1984 ABC-TV series Lottery! also explored sudden wealth and its impacts upon its beneficiaries, as did the NBC-TV shows Sweepstakes in 1979 and Windfall in 2006; all three had short runs. The 2013 television show Lucky 7 had an even shorter run.

References

External links

 
 

1955 American television series debuts
1960 American television series endings
1950s American anthology television series
1960s American anthology television series
1950s American crime drama television series
1960s American crime drama television series
Black-and-white American television shows
Television series by CBS Studios
CBS original programming
English-language television shows